Zoltán Gera (born 22 April 1979) is a Hungarian former professional footballer who played as a midfielder for Fulham, Pécsi Mecsek and Harkány SE, as well as enjoying two spells at Ferencváros and West Bromwich Albion.

Gera is known for his overhead-kick goals and his cartwheel to back-flip celebration, which he demonstrated in Fulham's Europa League quarter-final win against Juventus in 2010. He was named Hungarian Player of the Year in 2002, 2004 and 2005. For his efforts in the 2009–10 season and his goals in the Europa League, Gera was named Fulham's Player of the Season.

Gera made his international debut for Hungary in 2002 against Switzerland, with his nation losing 2–1. In 2009, Gera briefly retired from the national team following a dispute with then-manager Erwin Koeman. When Koeman was replaced by Sándor Egervári in 2010, Gera returned to Hungary's international squad which he later represented at the 2016 UEFA European Championship. He announced his final retirement from football on 28 June 2018.

Club career

Harkány SE
Gera started his professional career for Harkány SE in 1996, remaining there for one year before signing for Pécsi Mecsek FC.

Pécsi Mecsek
Gera was signed by Pécsi Mecsek in 1997. During his three-year spell with the club, he made 87 appearances and scored 16 times. On 1 July 2000, Gera moved to major Hungarian side Ferencváros on a free transfer.

Ferencváros
During his four-year spell at Ferencváros, Gera played 115 league games and scored 32 goals. He won the Hungarian league title in 2001 and 2004, the Magyar Kupa in 2003 and 2004, and the Szuperkupa in 2004. He also received his first international call up while with the club.

West Bromwich Albion
He signed a three-year contract with Albion, with a further one-year option in the club's favour. He made his Premier League debut on 14 August 2004, replacing Andy Johnson in the 87th minute against Blackburn Rovers. The match ended in a 1–1 draw. Gera's first appearance in the starting lineup came on 25 August 2004 against Tottenham Hotspur. He scored his first league goal early in the third minute; that match also ended in a 1–1 draw.

The club struggled against relegation for most of the season, and Gera was portrayed by the media as an integral part of this struggle. Towards the end of the season, however, Gera's influence grew. He produced stirring performances, including a match-winning header against Everton on 3 April 2005. The club's form quickly improved, securing its continued Premier League status on the last day of the season. Gera scored six league goals in this his first season and was the only player at the club to appear in all 38 league matches. He was nominated in the end-of-season "dream team" by soccernet.com.
During the 2005–06 season, Gera struggled with injuries and underwent a hernia operation in November 2005. At the end of the season, West Brom were relegated and Gera committed himself to the club. His performance in the club's 4–2 win against Charlton Athletic on 15 December 2007, scoring twice and setting up a third goal, earned him a place in the Championship Team of the Week. Gera helped Albion gain promotion in the 2007–08 season; on 9 June 2008, he decided to turn down a new contract offer from West Brom, choosing instead to join Fulham in the Premier League on a free transfer. The three-year contract was completed on 11 June 2008.

Fulham

Gera made his Fulham debut in a 2–1 defeat to Hull City on the opening day of the 2008–09 Premier League. Minutes after coming off the bench, he scored Fulham's second goal in a 2–0 win against league leaders Manchester United. During the 2009–10 Premier League season, Gera scored his first goal of the season against West Ham United in a 2–2 draw. On 28 December 2009, Gera scored his second goal of the season at Stamford Bridge against Chelsea, when he hooked the ball over Petr Čech from 12 yards after four minutes. Despite this early goal, Fulham lost the game 2–1. Gera went on to score two goals in a man of the match performance against Juventus, Fulham winning 4–1. He scored the goal which sent Fulham to its first ever European final in a 2–1 victory against Hamburger SV; while Fulham lost the final 2–1, Gera did provide the sole goal's assist. Having scored ten goals in all competitions, Gera was voted the fans' player of the season for Fulham's 2009–10 season.

Gera started the 2010–11 season by scoring a hat-trick after coming off the bench in the 66th minute against Werder Bremen in a 5–1 friendly win, and a brace against Port Vale in the second round of the League Cup. His first league goal of the new campaign, a 30-yard volley which deflected off the post and then off the goalkeeper, came at The Hawthorns against former club West Brom. Despite this, Fulham manager Mark Hughes did not regularly start Gera, despite him being a fan favourite, instead using him sparingly as a substitute. Gera was sent off in Fulham's final match of the 2010–11 Premier League season on 22 May 2011, a 2–2 draw against Arsenal. This was the first red card Fulham had received all season and it nearly cost them a place in the Europa League through UEFA's Fair Play League, but Fulham finished ahead of closest challengers Blackpool by 0.01 points to win the qualifying berth.

On 16 June 2011, Fulham announced that Gera was available on a free transfer as one of three players that were being released by the club Subsequently, Gera looked to rejoin his former club West Brom.

Return to West Bromwich Albion
On 2 August 2011, West Brom boss Roy Hodgson announced that the club had signed Gera on a two-year deal. On 5 November 2011, he made his second debut for West Brom as a starter in a 3–0 loss to Arsenal. After three first team appearances, Gera was injured in a 3–1 defeat against Tottenham Hotspur on 26 November 2011; he was unavailable for the remainder of the season. After nine months out due to his injury, Gera returned to the starting lineup against Liverpool on the first day of the 2012–13 Premier League season, opening the scoring with a volley from 25 yards, leading to a 3–0 win. On 8 January 2013, it was confirmed Gera would be out injured for the rest of the season after he injured a knee in a game against Queens Park Rangers. On 1 July 2013, Gera's contract with West Brom expired, making him a free agent for a short period until he signed a new contract for another year with the club. Gera left West Brom in 2014 after his contract expired.

Ferencváros
On 2 April 2016, Gera became Hungarian League champion with Ferencváros after losing to Debreceni VSC 2–1 at the Nagyerdei Stadion in the 2015–16 Nemzeti Bajnokság I season.

He scored the only and winning goal in the 2016 Magyar Kupa Final on 7 May 2016 against archrival Újpest FC at the Groupama Arena.

International career

Gera earned his first international cap for the Hungary national team on 13 February 2002 in a 2–1 defeat to Switzerland. Up to 2009, he had played 63 games for Hungary, scoring 18 goals. Before the 2010 FIFA World Cup qualification match on 14 October 2009 against Denmark, Gera was excluded from the match squad by coach Erwin Koeman after he arrived late at a team meeting. Following the incident, Gera announced his retirement from the national team. On 23 July 2010, the newly appointed board of the Hungarian Football Federation terminated the contract of Koeman and appointed Sándor Egervári as the new national team coach. After a personal discussion with Egervári, Gera returned to the national team on 11 August 2010 against England.

On 29 March 2011, Gera scored twice against the Netherlands in the Amsterdam Arena in front of 51,700 spectators in a UEFA Euro 2012 qualifying match. He scored the first goal in the 50th minute and his second goal in the 75th minute. Gera's goals, however, were not enough as Hungary lost 5–3. On 7 September 2012, Hungary started their 2014 World Cup qualifying campaign with a 5–0 win in Andorra; Gera scored the second goal. On 16 October 2012, Hungary beat Turkey at home 3–1. Gera scored the third Hungarian goal.

On 31 May 2016, Gera was selected as vice-captain for the Hungarian squad for Euro 2016 in France. On 14 June, Gera played in the first group match in a 2–0 victory over Austria at the Nouveau Stade de Bordeaux in Hungary's first match of the tournament. Four days later, on 18 June, he played in a 1–1 draw against Iceland at the Stade Vélodrome, Marseille. On 22 June, he played in the last group match in a 3–3 draw against Portugal at the Parc Olympique Lyonnais, Lyon, and scored the first goal with a terrific half-volley from 25 yards out with his weaker foot. In so doing, he became the second-oldest goalscorer and the oldest goalscorer from open play at a European Championship, aged 37 years and 62 days; Austria's Ivica Vastić is the oldest scorer, at 38 years and 257 days, when he converted a penalty at Euro 2008. Gera's goal was later voted the "Goal of the Tournament" in a UEFA online fan poll.

Personal life
Gera married on 19 June 2004; his wife gave birth to a boy named Szabolcs on 15 March 2008. Following the birth, he was given leave by his national team manager Péter Várhidi to miss Hungary's friendly against Slovenia to spend time with his family. In 2005, Gera featured in a television advertisement for Pepsi representing the 2006 World Cup, alongside Thierry Henry, David Beckham, Roberto Carlos, Ronaldinho, Nicklas Bendtner, Neil Ruddock and Raúl.

Gera is a member of the Faith Church and was featured in billboard advertisements promoting the organization. He has often defended the Church from its critics and promoted it several times in the media. He credits the Church with saving his life, helping him change his destructive lifestyle which included crime and drug abuse.

Career statistics

Club

International

Scores and results list Hungary's goal tally first, score column indicates score after each Gera goal.

Managerial

Honours
Ferencváros
Nemzeti Bajnokság I: 2000–01, 2003–04, 2015–16
Magyar Kupa: 2002–03, 2003–04, 2014–15, 2015–16, 2016–17
Ligakupa: 2014–15
Szuperkupa: 2004, 2015, 2016

West Bromwich Albion
Football League Championship: 2007–08

Fulham
UEFA Europa League runner-up: 2009–10

Individual
 Tibor Simon Award: 2003
 Hungarian Footballer of the Year: 2004 & 2005 
 Fulham Player of the Year: 2009–10
 UEFA Euro 2016 Fan's Goal of the Tournament

References

External links

Zoltán Gera official website

1979 births
Living people
Sportspeople from Pécs
Hungarian Pentecostals
Hungarian footballers
Association football midfielders
Hungary international footballers
UEFA Euro 2016 players
Nemzeti Bajnokság I players
Premier League players
Pécsi MFC players
Ferencvárosi TC footballers
West Bromwich Albion F.C. players
Fulham F.C. players
English Football League players
Hungarian expatriate footballers
Hungarian expatriate sportspeople in England
Expatriate footballers in England